NUBS may refer to:
 Newcastle University Business School
 Nanjing University Business School
 Nottingham University Business School

See also
Nubs Kleinke (1911–1950), Major League Baseball player]]
Nub (disambiguation)